Chippewa County is a county located in the U.S. state of Wisconsin. It is named for the historic Chippewa people, also known as the Ojibwe, who long controlled this territory. As of the 2020 census, the population was 66,297. Its county seat is Chippewa Falls. The county was founded in 1845 from Crawford County, then in the Wisconsin Territory, and organized in 1853.

Chippewa County is included in the Eau Claire, WI Metropolitan Statistical Area as well as the Eau Claire-Menomonie, WI Combined Statistical Area.

Geography

 
Parts of northern Chippewa county are covered with choppy hills dimpled by kettle lakes and bogs—the terminal moraine left by the last glacier. The Ice Age Trail threads through some of this country, providing public foot-access to these unusual landforms.

Adjacent counties
 Rusk County – north
 Taylor County – east
 Clark County – southeast
 Eau Claire County – south
 Dunn County – west
 Barron County – northwest

Major highways

Railroads
Union Pacific
Wisconsin Northern Railroad
Canadian National

Buses
Eau Claire Transit
List of intercity bus stops in Wisconsin

Airports
 KEAU - Chippewa Valley Regional Airport
 4WI9 - Cornell Municipal Airport

Demographics

2020 census
As of the census of 2020, the population was 66,297. The racial makeup of the county was 91.8% White, 1.6% Black or African American, 1.5% Asian, 0.5% Native American, 0.6% from other races, and 4.0% from two or more races. Ethnically, the population was 1.9% Hispanic or Latino of any race.

2000 census

As of the census of 2000, there were 55,195 people, 21,356 households, and 15,013 families residing in the county.  The population density was 55 people per square mile (21/km2).  There were 22,821 housing units at an average density of 23 per square mile (9/km2).  The racial makeup of the county was 97.85% White, 0.16% Black or African American, 0.32% Native American, 0.89% Asian, 0.01% Pacific Islander, 0.17% from other races, and 0.60% from two or more races.  0.52% of the population were Hispanic or Latino of any race. 44.1% were of German, 15.8% Norwegian and 5.8% Irish ancestry.

There were 21,356 households, out of which 33.70% had children under the age of 18 living with them, 58.30% were married couples living together, 8.00% had a female householder with no husband present, and 29.70% were non-families. 24.70% of all households were made up of individuals, and 11.00% had someone living alone who was 65 years of age or older.  The average household size was 2.53 and the average family size was 3.03.

In the county, the population was spread out, with 26.50% under the age of 18, 7.70% from 18 to 24, 28.20% from 25 to 44, 23.10% from 45 to 64, and 14.60% who were 65 years of age or older.  The median age was 38 years. For every 100 females, there were 99.10 males.  For every 100 females age 18 and over, there were 96.00 males.

In 2017, there were 624 births, giving a general fertility rate of 59.7 births per 1000 women aged 15–44, the 26th lowest rate out of all 72 Wisconsin counties. Additionally, there were fewer than five reported induced abortions performed on women of Chippewa County residence in 2017.

Economy
The largest employers in Chippewa County are:

Library
The University of Wisconsin-Eau Claire's Special Collections and Archives, located on the fifth floor of McIntyre Library, houses an extensive collection of public records, books and collections relating to Chippewa County. In addition to vital records (birth and marriage) dating to 1907, there are also naturalization records, census records, and civil and circuit court records. These resources are very popular with local genealogists.

Within the local history collection, there are books about immigration to the region, logging, church and cemetery records, reminiscences by local residents, and a number of histories and biographies compiled by local historians.

Special Collections and Archives also houses numerous archives files which relate to Chippewa County. There are many collections which pertain to logging, the railway industry and agriculture.

The University of Wisconsin-Eau Claire's Special Collections and Archives also includes information for Buffalo, Clark, Eau Claire, Rusk and Taylor counties.

Communities

Cities
 Bloomer
 Chippewa Falls (county seat)
 Cornell
 Eau Claire (mostly in Eau Claire County)
 Stanley (partly in Clark County)

Villages
 Boyd
 Cadott
 Lake Hallie
 New Auburn (partly in Barron County)

Towns

 Anson
 Arthur
 Auburn
 Birch Creek
 Bloomer
 Cleveland
 Colburn
 Cooks Valley
 Delmar
 Eagle Point
 Edson
 Estella
 Goetz
 Hallie
 Howard
 Lafayette
 Lake Holcombe
 Ruby
 Sampson
 Sigel
 Tilden
 Wheaton
 Woodmohr

Census-designated places
 Holcombe
 Jim Falls
 Lake Wissota

Other unincorporated communities

 Albertville
 Anson
 Arnold
 Bateman
 Brownville
 Cobban
 Colburn
 Crescent
 Drywood
 Eagle Point
 Eagleton
 Edson
 Howard
 Huron
 Maple Hill
 Old Albertville
 Pine Grove
 Ruby
 Tilden

Politics
At the presidential level, Chippewa County leans Republican; however, Barack Obama won the county in 2008. In 2020, Donald Trump received 59.3 percent of the vote, the best result for a Republican since Dwight Eisenhower in 1956.

See also
 National Register of Historic Places listings in Chippewa County, Wisconsin

References

Further reading
 Forrester, George (ed.) Historical and Biographical Album of the Chippewa Valley Wisconsin. Chicago: A. Warner, 1891–2.
 Randall, Thomas E. History of the Chippewa Valley. Eau Claire, Wis.: Free Press, 1875.

External links
 Chippewa County government website
 Chippewa County map from the Wisconsin Department of Transportation
 Chippewa County Historical Society
 University of Wisconsin-Eau Claire, Special Collections and Archives

 
1845 establishments in Wisconsin Territory
Populated places established in 1845
Eau Claire–Chippewa Falls metropolitan area